Musburger is a surname. Notable people with the surname include:

Brent Musburger (born 1939), American sportscaster
Todd Musburger, American attorney

See also
Meusburger